Anchinia furculata is a moth in the family Depressariidae. It was described by Edward Meyrick in 1925. It is found in South Africa, where it has been recorded from KwaZulu-Natal.

The wingspan is about 23 mm. The forewings are whitish, irregularly sprinkled with purplish grey, with some black scales, the median third is faintly rosy tinged. There is a faint ferruginous tinge beneath the costa towards the base and there are seven cloudy spots of dark purplish-brown suffusion on the costa between one-fourth and the apex, these are darker and more defined posteriorly. A transverse black linear mark is found in the disc at two-fifths, sending posteriorly from its upper extremity a similar longitudinal mark. There is also an irregular partly transverse and partly longitudinal blackish spot in the discal two-thirds, with some brownish tinge above it. A subcostal series of several indistinct longitudinal marks of purple-brown and dark fuscous scales is found on the median third and there are two faint transverse shades of purplish-grey sprinkles posteriorly, somewhat bent above the middle. A marginal series of blackish marks is found around the apex and termen. The hindwings are pale grey, whitish tinged towards the base.

References

Endemic moths of South Africa
Moths described in 1925
Anchinia